The Burundi national rugby league team are a rugby league team representing Burundi at the international level. Their first international was a 4-4 draw against DR Congo.

References

National rugby league teams
Rugby league in Africa
R